E54 may refer to:
 European route E54, a road
 A variation of the Nimzo-Indian Defence, Gligoric System, Encyclopaedia of Chess Openings code
 Onomichi Expressway and Matsue Expressway, route E54 in Japan